The M86 Pursuit Deterrent Munition (PDM) is a small United States anti-personnel mine intended to be used by special forces to deter pursuing enemy forces.

Description
The M86 anti-personnel mine is to be deployed as a deterrent munition by special forces or selected personnel only on operations where they may be pursued by an enemy.

The M86 mine is similar in configuration and possesses functioning characteristics of the ADAM mine presently loaded in the 155mm projectile, M731 (and M692). The mine is wedge shaped, and contains a safety clip, arming strap assembly, internal safety and arming device, seven trip-line sensor, a reserve battery, electronic circuitry containing an IC chip, and a kill mechanism surrounded by an overlay containing a liquid propellant, and encapsulated in a moulded plastic form.

The M86 antipersonnel mine is manually armed by removing the safety clip and then the arming strap assembly. A camming action breaks the shorting bar and forces the battery ball against the battery breaking the glass ampule containing an electrolyte which activates the reserve battery and provides power. The shorting bar hook, attached to the cam, shears the shorting bar (a safety device across the detonator). After a 60-second (nominal) electronic time delay, a piston actuator in the Safe and Arm mechanism is electrically fired, moving a slider to align the detonator with an explosive lead in the slider. At the same time, seven sensor trip-lines are released. Approximately three or four trip-lines will deploy up to 20 feet  from the mine, depending upon the at-rest position of the mine. The remaining trip-lines may be hindered due to their proximity to the resting surface. After an additional 10-second electronic time delay, allowing the munition to return to equilibrium, the mine is fully armed electronically. Disturbance of a trip-line, or the mine itself, now triggers a switch which completes an electronic firing circuit. The S&A electric detonator initiates the S&A firing train which initiates a detonating cord which then initiates a thin layer of liquid propellant, which by gravity rests under the kill mechanism, shattering the plastic mine body and propelling the kill mechanism upwards from 6 inches to 8 feet above the ground where it detonates. The kill mechanism is a spheroid internally embossed and loaded with 21 grams of Comp A5 and when detonated, propels fragments in a high velocity spherical pattern.

If the mine is not activated by trip-line or disturbance mode, a factory preset self-destruct feature initiates the mine in 4 hours plus 0-20%.

Dimensions
 Height: 3.203 in
 Radius (max): 2.924 in
 Thickness:72° wedge

See also
Land mine

References

External links
 http://www.globalsecurity.org/military/systems/munitions/pdm.htm
 https://fas.org/man/dod-101/sys/land/pdm.htm

Anti-personnel mines
Land mines of the United States